Albert Joseph Tsiahoana (3 August 1927 – 15 June 2012) was the Catholic archbishop of the Archdiocese of Antsiranana, Madagascar.

Ordained to the priesthood in 1956, he became a bishop in 1964; he resigned in 1998.

Notes

1927 births
2012 deaths
20th-century Roman Catholic archbishops in Madagascar
Malagasy Roman Catholic archbishops
Roman Catholic archbishops of Antsiranana